Lunch with Charles is a romantic comedy-drama film, directed by Michael Parker and released in 2001. A coproduction of companies from Canada and Hong Kong, the film stars Sean Lau as Tong, a Hong Kong musician and businessman who has been living apart from his wife April (Theresa Lee) for three years due to his reluctance to join her when her career in public relations took her to Vancouver.

Believing that she is having an affair, he now travels to Vancouver to track her down, staying at a bed and breakfast run by Matthew (Nicholas Lea) and Natasha (Bif Naked), just as April is about to head to Banff with her client Tom (Tom Scholte) in hopes of signing a popular rock band to endorse his product, with Matthew, Natasha and Tong also following after the band's lead singer quits, and their manager Charles (Philip Granger), an old friend of Natasha's from her own days as a musician, calls and asks her to replace him.

The film won three Leo Awards in 2001, for Best Director (Parker), Best Screenwriter (Parker) and Best Musical Score (Simon Kendall), and was also nominated for Best Film, Best Actor (Lea), Best Cinematography (John Houtman), Best Production Design (Michael Bjornson). Kendall, Tom Landa and Geoffrey Kelly received a Genie Award nomination for Best Original Song at the 22nd Genie Awards in 2001 for the song "Parting Glass".

References

External links

2001 films
Canadian romantic comedy-drama films
Canadian road comedy-drama films
Hong Kong romantic comedy-drama films
Films shot in British Columbia
Films set in Vancouver
Films set in Alberta
2000s road comedy-drama films
2001 romantic comedy-drama films
2000s Canadian films
2000s Hong Kong films